Nomophila is a genus of moths of the family Crambidae.

Species
Nomophila africana Munroe, 1973
Nomophila albisignalis Hampson, 1913
Nomophila brevispinalis Munroe, 1973
Nomophila colombiana Munroe, 1973
Nomophila corticalis (Walker, 1869)
Nomophila distinctalis Munroe, 1973
Nomophila helvolalis (Maassen, 1890)
Nomophila heterospila (Meyrick, 1936)
Nomophila incognita Viette, 1959
Nomophila indistinctalis (Walker, 1863)
Nomophila moluccana Pagenstecher, 1884
Nomophila nearctica Munroe, 1973
Nomophila noctuella (Denis & Schiffermüller, 1775)
Nomophila triticalis Berg, 1875

Former species
Nomophila astigmalis Hampson, 1899

References

Natural History Museum Lepidoptera genus database

Spilomelinae
Crambidae genera
Taxa named by Jacob Hübner